The Ource is a  long river in northeastern France, a right tributary of the river Seine. Its source is in the Haute-Marne department, 2 km south of Poinson-lès-Grancey. It flows generally northwest. It joins the Seine at Bar-sur-Seine.

Its course crosses the following departments and communes:
Haute-Marne: Poinson-lès-Grancey
Côte-d'Or: Recey-sur-Ource, Brion-sur-Ource, Autricourt, Grancey-sur-Ource
Aube: Essoyes, Celles-sur-Ource, Bar-sur-Seine

References

Rivers of France
Rivers of Grand Est
Rivers of Bourgogne-Franche-Comté
Rivers of Haute-Marne
Rivers of Côte-d'Or
Rivers of Aube